Sol y Lluvia is a Chilean musical ensemble formed in the 1970s by the Labra brothers. It became popular as a result not only of its music, but also because of its firm opposition to the dictatorship of Augusto Pinochet.

The band's music blends modern musical instruments (drum set, electric guitar, bass guitar, and saxophone) with traditional Andean or Chilean instruments, including the charango and zampona. Lyrics with references to peace, poverty, family and god earned him more than a few associations with the Christian Democratic Party (which never really existed).

Members

Discography

Studio albums 
 1980: Canto + Vida
 1987: A desatar esperanza
 1988: + personas
 1989: Testimonio de paz (Alerce)
 1993: Hacia la tierra (Alerce)
 2000: La vida siempre (Alerce)
 2004: La conspiración de la esperanza (Universal)
 2013: Clima humana (Mastér Media)

Live albums 
 1982: Canto es vida
 1989: El aire volverá
 1990: Adiós General! Adiós carnaval!
 1992: Somos Gente de la Tierra (Alerce)
 2005: Vive!!
 2012: 30 Años En Vivo!!! (Mastér Media)

References

External links
Sol y Lluvia (Official website)
"Adiós Sebastián" - Domingo Familiar por la Educación. Agosto 2011

Chilean musical groups
Musical advocacy groups